Matus is a genus of beetle in family Dytiscidae from North America. It contains the following species:

 Matus bicarinatus (Say, 1823)
 Matus leechi Young, 1953
 Matus ovatus Leech, 1941
 Matus relictus Young, 1953

References

Dytiscidae genera
Taxa named by Charles Nicholas Aubé